Pálffy Palace may refer to various Central European palaces owned by the noble Pálffy ab Erdöd family:
 Palais Pálffy in Vienna, Innere Stadt, Josefsplatz 
 Palais Pálffy in Vienna, Innere Stadt, Wallnerstraße Street
 Pálffy Palace in Bratislava, Old Town, Hviezdoslavovo námestie
 Pálffy Palace in Bratislava, Old Town, Ventúrska Street
 Pálffy Palace in Bratislava, Old Town, Panská Street
 Pálffy Palace in Bratislava, Old Town, Podhradie, Zámocká Street
 Pálffy Palace in Bratislava, Old Town, Laurinská Street
 demolished Pálffy Palace in Bratislava, Old Town, Gorkého Street
 Pálffy Palace in Prague, Malá Strana
 Pálffy Palace (Pálffy-kastély) in Budapest, Hungary